SOLEIL ("Sun" in French) is a synchrotron facility near Paris, France. It performed its first acceleration of electrons on May 14, 2006. The name SOLEIL is a backronym for Source optimisée de lumière d’énergie intermédiaire du LURE (LURE optimised intermediary energy light source), LURE meaning Laboratoire pour l'utilisation du rayonnement électromagnétique.

The facility is run by a civil corporation held by the French National Centre for Scientific Research (CNRS) and the French Alternative Energies and Atomic Energy Commission (CEA), two French national research agencies. It is located in Saint-Aubin in the Essonne département, a south-western suburb of Paris, near Gif-sur-Yvette and Saclay, which host other facilities for nuclear and particle physics.

The facility is an associate member of the University of Paris-Saclay.

SOLEIL also hosts IPANEMA, the European research platform on ancient materials (archaeology, palaeontology, past environments and cultural heritage), a joint CNRS / French Ministry of Culture and Communication research unit.

SOLEIL covers fundamental research needs in physics, chemistry, material sciences, life sciences (notably in the crystallography of biological macromolecules), earth sciences, and atmospheric sciences. It offers the use of a wide range of spectroscopic methods from infrared to X-rays, and structural methods such as X-ray diffraction and diffusion.

Main parameters
SOLEIL contains electrons travelling with an energy of 2.75 GeV around a 354 m circumference. It takes the electrons 1.2 μs to travel around this ring at almost the speed of light; 847,000 times per second.

Notable Experiments

References

External links
 
 Official website 
 Official website 
 LURE website 
 Lightsources.org
 Official website of IPANEMA 
 Official website of IPANEMA  

Synchrotron radiation facilities
Research institutes in France